Greater Manchester is a metropolitan county in North West England. It was created by the Local Government Act 1972, and consists of the metropolitan boroughs of Bolton, Bury, Oldham, Rochdale, Stockport, Tameside, Trafford, Wigan and the cities of Manchester and Salford. This is a complete list of the Grade I listed churches in the metropolitan county as recorded in the National Heritage List for England. Buildings are listed by the Secretary of State for Culture, Media and Sport on the recommendation of English Heritage. Grade I listed buildings are defined as being of "exceptional interest, sometimes considered to be internationally important"; only 2.5 per cent of listed buildings are included in this grade.

Christian churches have existed in Greater Manchester since the Anglo-Saxon era, but no significant Saxon features remain in its listed churches, and the only Norman material is to be found in St Leonard, Middleton. The churches in this list fall into two main groups: those originating mainly from the medieval period, which are in Gothic style, and churches built during the 19th and 20th centuries, mainly in Gothic Revival style, with only a few churches created between these periods. Gothic churches originating from the medieval era include Manchester Cathedral, St Mary, Radcliffe, and St Werburgh Old Church, Warburton. Churches from the 19th century include some of the finest works of the leading architects of the period: George Gilbert Scott (St Mark, Worsley), Alfred Waterhouse (St Elisabeth, Reddish), George Frederick Bodley (St Augustine, Pendlebury), and Charles Barry (All Saints, Whitefield). Built between these periods was the Neoclassical church of St Ann, Manchester. All the above examples are Anglican churches. There are two Roman Catholic churches in the list: Joseph A. Hansom's Holy Name of Jesus, Manchester, and E. W. Pugin's All Saints, Urmston, and one church built for the Christian Scientists, the Edgar Wood Centre.

Greater Manchester is mainly urban, and is one of the most densely populated regions in Europe. In the second half of the 18th century, the Industrial Revolution played an important role in the growth and development of Manchester and its surrounding area, and industry continues to be a major part of the region's economy. There are few buildings surviving from before the Industrial Revolution, but many from the 19th and 20th centuries. The bedrock consists mainly of Carboniferous sandstones, including millstone grit, which is a major source of building material for the region's churches. The superficial deposits are of boulder clay, which provides material for making bricks.

Churches

References

Citations

Sources 

 
 
 

 
Greater Manchester
 
Lists of listed buildings in Greater Manchester